Ignominy may refer to:

 "Ignominy", part two of the 1944 Lao She novel Four Generations Under One Roof
 "Ignomínia" (English: Ignominy), a poem in the 2006 Conceição Lima collection A Dolorosa Raiz do Micondó
 "Ignominy", song on the 2015 Broken Flesh album Broken Flesh

See also
 Shame
 Humiliation